A special election was held in  on September 15, 1800 to fill a vacancy left by the resignation of Jonathan Brace (F) in May, 1800.

Election results

Smith took his seat on November 17, 1800, at the start of the 2nd session of the 6th Congress.

See also
List of special elections to the United States House of Representatives

References

1800
Connecticut
Connecticut 1800
Connecticut at-large
United States House of Representatives 1800 at-large
House